Peter Sands may refer to:

 Peter Sands (banker) (born 1962), CEO of Standard Chartered Bank
 Peter Sands (politician) (1924–2015), Irish Fianna Fáil politician
 Peter Sands, a fictional character in the TV series Private Secretary